A spermatozoon (also spelled spermatozoön;) is a motile sperm cell, or moving form of the haploid cell that is the male gamete. A spermatozoon joins an ovum to form a zygote. (A zygote is a single cell, with a complete set of chromosomes, that normally develops into an embryo.)
 
Sperm cells contribute approximately half of the nuclear genetic information to the diploid offspring (excluding, in most cases, mitochondrial DNA). In mammals, the sex of the offspring is determined by the sperm cell: a spermatozoon bearing an X chromosome will lead to a female (XX) offspring, while one bearing a Y chromosome will lead to a male (XY) offspring. Sperm cells were first observed in Antonie van Leeuwenhoek's laboratory in 1677.

Mammalian spermatozoon structure, function, and size

Humans
The human sperm cell is the reproductive cell in males and will only survive in warm environments; once it leaves the male body the sperm's survival likelihood is reduced and it may die, thereby decreasing the total sperm quality. Sperm cells come in two types, "female" and "male". Sperm cells that give rise to female (XX) offspring after fertilization differ in that they carry an X-chromosome, while sperm cells that give rise to male (XY) offspring carry a Y-chromosome.

A human sperm cell consists of a flat, disc shaped head 5.1 µm by 3.1 µm and a tail known as a flagellum 50 µm long. The flagellum propels the sperm cell (at about 1–3 mm/minute in humans) by whipping in an elliptical cone. Sperm have an olfactory  guidance mechanism, and after reaching the Fallopian tubes, must undergo a period of capacitation before penetration of the ovum.

Head: It has a compact nucleus with only chromatic substance and is surrounded by only a thin rim of cytoplasm. Above the nucleus lies a cap-like structure called the acrosome, formed by modification of the Golgi body, which secretes the enzyme spermlysin (hyaluronidase, corona-penetrating enzyme, zona lysin, or acrosin), that is necessary for fertilization. As the spermatozoon approaches the egg, it undergoes the acrosome reaction in which the membrane surrounding the acrosome fuses with the plasma membrane of the sperm's head, exposing the contents of the acrosome. 

Neck: It is the smallest part (.03µm), and has a proximal centriole parallel to the base of the nucleus and distal centriole perpendicular to the previous one. The proximal centriole is present also in the mature spermatozoon; the distal centriole disappears after axoneme assembly. The proximal centriole enters into the egg during fertilisation and starts the first cleavage division of the egg, which has no centriole. The distal centriole gives rise to the axial filament which forms the tail and has a (9+2) arrangement. A transitory membrane called the Manchette lies in the middle piece.

Middle piece: It has 10–14 spirals of mitochondria surrounding the axial filament in the cytoplasm. It provides motility, and hence is called the powerhouse of the sperm.  It also has a ring centriole (annulus) that form a diffusion barrier between the middle piece and the principal piece and serve as a stabilizing structure for tail rigidity.

Tail: The flagellum is the longest part (50µm), having an axial filament surrounded by cytoplasm and plasma membrane, but at the posterior end the axial filament is naked. The flagellum gives movement to the cell.

Semen has an alkaline nature and the spermatozoa do not reach full motility (hypermotility) until they reach the vagina, where the alkaline pH is neutralized by acidic vaginal fluids.  This gradual process takes 20–30 minutes. During this period, fibrinogen from the seminal vesicles forms a clot, securing and protecting the sperm. Just as they become hypermotile, fibrinolysin from the prostate gland dissolves the clot, allowing the sperm to progress optimally.

The spermatozoon is characterized by a minimum of cytoplasm and the most densely packed DNA known in eukaryotes. Compared to mitotic chromosomes in somatic cells, sperm DNA is at least sixfold more highly condensed.

The specimen contributes with DNA/chromatin, a centriole, and perhaps also an oocyte-activating factor (OAF). It may also contribute with paternal messenger RNA (mRNA), also contributing to embryonic development.
 The human spermatozoon contains at least 7500 different proteins.

Human sperm genetics has been associated with human evolution, per a 2020 study.

DNA damage and repair
DNA damages present in spermatozoa in the period after meiosis but before fertilization may be repaired in the fertilized egg, but if not repaired, can have serious deleterious effects on fertility and the developing embryo.  Human spermatozoa are particularly vulnerable to free radical attack and the generation of oxidative DNA damage. (see e.g. 8-Oxo-2'-deoxyguanosine)

Exposure of males to certain lifestyle, environmental or occupational hazards may increase the risk of aneuploid spermatozoa.  In particular, risk of aneuploidy is increased by tobacco smoking, and occupational exposure to benzene, insecticides, and perfluorinated compounds.  Increased aneuploidy of spermatozoa often occurs in association with increased DNA damage. DNA fragmentation and increased in situ DNA susceptibility to denaturation, the features similar to these seen during apoptosis of somatic cells, characterize abnormal spermatozoa in cases of male infertility.

Avoidance of immune system response

Glycoprotein molecules on the surface of ejaculated sperm cells are recognized by all human female immune systems, and interpreted as a signal that the cell should not be rejected. The female immune system might otherwise attack sperm in the reproductive tract. The specific glycoproteins coating sperm cells are also utilized by some cancerous and bacterial cells, some parasitic worms, and HIV-infected white blood cells, thereby avoiding an immune response from the host organism.

The blood-testis barrier, maintained by the tight junctions between the Sertoli cells of the seminiferous tubules, prevents communication between the forming spermatozoa in the testis and the blood vessels (and immune cells circulating within them) within the interstitial space. This prevents them from eliciting an immune response. The blood-testis barrier is also important in preventing toxic substances from disrupting spermatogenesis.

Spermatozoa in other organisms

Animals
Fertilization relies on spermatozoa for most sexually reproductive animals.

Some species of fruit fly produce the largest known spermatozoon found in nature.  Drosophila melanogaster produces sperm that can be up to 1.8 mm, while its relative Drosophila bifurca produces the largest known spermatozoon, measuring over 58 mm in length. In Drosophila melanogaster, the entire sperm, tail included, gets incorporated into the oocyte cytoplasm, however, for Drosophila bifurca only a small portion of the tail enters the oocyte.

The wood mouse Apodemus sylvaticus possesses spermatozoa with falciform morphology. Another characteristics which makes these gametocytes unique is the presence of an apical hook on the sperm head. This hook is used to attach to the hooks or to the flagella of other spermatozoa. Aggregation is caused by these attachments and mobile trains result. These trains provide improved motility in the female reproductive tract and are a means by which fertilization is promoted.

The postmeiotic phase of mouse spermatogenesis is very sensitive to environmental genotoxic agents, because as male germ cells form mature spermatozoa they progressively lose the ability to repair DNA damage.  Irradiation of male mice during late spermatogenesis can induce damage that persists for at least 7 days in the fertilizing spermatozoa, and disruption of maternal DNA double-strand break repair pathways increases spermatozoa-derived chromosomal aberrations.  Treatment of male mice with melphalan, a bifunctional alkylating agent frequently employed in chemotherapy, induces DNA lesions during meiosis that may persist in an unrepaired state as germ cells progress through DNA repair-competent phases of spermatogenic development.  Such unrepaired DNA damages in spermatozoa, after fertilization, can lead to offspring with various abnormalities.

Sea urchins such as Arbacia punctulata are ideal organisms to use in sperm research, they spawn large numbers of sperm into the sea, making them well-suited as model organisms for experiments.

The spermatozoa of marsupials are usually longer than those of placental mammals.

Plants, algae and fungi
The gametophytes of bryophytes, ferns and some gymnosperms produce motile sperm cells, contrary to pollen grains employed in most gymnosperms and all angiosperms. This renders sexual reproduction in the absence of water impossible, since water is a necessary medium for sperm and egg to meet. Algae and lower plant sperm cells are often multi-flagellated (see image) and thus morphologically different from animal spermatozoa.

Some algae and fungi produce non-motile sperm cells, called spermatia. In higher plants and some algae and fungi, fertilization involves the migration of the sperm nucleus through a fertilization tube (e.g. pollen tube in higher plants) to reach the egg cell.

Spermatozoa production in mammals

Spermatozoa are produced in the seminiferous tubules of the testes in a process called spermatogenesis. Round cells called spermatogonia divide and differentiate eventually to become spermatozoa. During copulation the cloaca or vagina gets inseminated, and then the spermatozoa move through chemotaxis to the ovum inside a Fallopian tube.

In assisted reproductive technology, normozoospermia is referred to a total amount of >39 mill ejaculated, >32% with progressive motility and >4% normal morphology. Also, a normal ejaculation in humans must have a volume over 1.5 ml, being an excessive volume 6 ml per ejaculation (hyperspermia). An insufficient volume is called hypospermia. These problems are related to several complications in spermatozoa production, for example:

 Hyperspermia: usually provoked because of prostate inflammation. 
 Hypospermia: an incomplete ejaculation, usually referred to an androgen deficit (hypoandrogenism) or obstruction in some part of the ejaculatory duct. In laboratory conditions, is also due to a partial loss of the sample. 
 Aspermia: there is no ejaculation. It could happen due to retrograde ejaculation, anatomical or neurological diseases or anti-hypertensive drugs.

Spermatozoa activation

Approaching the egg cell is a rather complex, multistep process of chemotaxis guided by different chemical substances/stimuli on individual levels of phylogeny. One of the most significant, common signaling characters of the event is that a prototype of professional chemotaxis receptors, formyl peptide receptor (60,000 receptor/cell) as well as the activator ability of its ligand formyl Met-Leu-Phe have been demonstrated in the surface membrane even in the case of human sperms.  
Mammalian sperm cells become even more active when they approach an egg cell in a process called sperm activation. Sperm activation has been shown to be caused by calcium ionophores in vitro, progesterone released by nearby cumulus cells and binding to ZP3 of the zona pellucida.  The cumulus cells are embedded in a gel-like substance made primarily of hyaluronic acid, and developed in the ovary with the egg and support it as it grows.

The initial change is called "hyperactivation", which causes a change in spermatozoa motility. They swim faster and their tail movements become more forceful and erratic.

A recent discovery links hyperactivation to a sudden influx of calcium ion into the tails.  The whip-like tail (flagellum) of the sperm is studded with ion channels formed by proteins called CatSper.  These channels are selective, allowing only calcium ions to pass.  The opening of CatSper channels is responsible for the influx of calcium.  The sudden rise in calcium levels causes the flagellum to form deeper bends, propelling the sperm more forcefully through the viscous environment. Sperm hyperactivity is necessary for breaking through two physical barriers that protect the egg from fertilization.

The second process in sperm activation is the acrosome reaction. This involves releasing the contents of the acrosome, which disperse, and the exposure of enzymes attached to the inner acrosomal membrane of the sperm.  This occurs after the sperm first meets the egg.  This lock-and-key type mechanism is species-specific and prevents the sperm and egg of different species from fusing.  There is some evidence that this binding is what triggers the acrosome to release the enzymes that allow the sperm to fuse with the egg.

ZP3, one of the proteins that make up the zona pellucida, then binds to a partner molecule on the sperm.  Enzymes on the inner acrosomal membrane digest the zona pellucida.  After the sperm penetrates the zona pellucida, part of the sperm's cell membrane then fuses with the egg cell's membrane, and the contents of the head diffuse into the egg.

Upon penetration, the oocyte is said to have become activated. It undergoes its secondary meiotic division, and the two haploid nuclei (paternal and maternal) fuse to form a zygote. In order to prevent polyspermy and minimise the possibility of producing a triploid zygote, several changes to the egg's zona pellucida renders them impenetrable shortly after the first sperm enters the egg.

Artificial storage
Spermatozoa can be stored in diluents such as the Illini Variable Temperature (IVT) diluent, which have been reported to be able to preserve high fertility of spermatozoa for over seven days. The IVT diluent is composed of several salts, sugars and antibacterial agents and gassed with CO2.

Semen cryopreservation can be used for far longer storage durations. For human spermatozoa, the longest reported successful storage with this method is 21 years.

MMP and capacitation 

The capacitation is the final phase of spermatozoa development, when they acquire the capability to fertilize the oocyte. In vivo, it happens during ejaculation, when spermatozoa leave the vagina and come in the superior female reproductive tract. In vitro, it happens when the spermatozoa is washed and purified. Almost 30-40% of infertility is due to male factor, so several strategies have been created in order to recover the functional spermatozoa. The MMP (Million Motile Progressive cells per milliliter) measure is synonymous with capacitation, and is very useful parameter to decide, along with a spermiogram, the kind of treatment needed. it represents the ratio between the % of progressive motile sperm obtained in capacitated and the % of progressive motile sperm obtained in ejaculated. It is based on the recovery percentage. Depending on the percentage, we will decide the quality of the motile spermatozoa recovery: 15 to 25 million sperm/ml is considered optimal, between 5 and 15 million is considered enough and less than 5 million is considered sub-optimal or not sufficient. Regarding the values that we have obtained, along with the spermiogram results, different techniques will be displayed. 

For example, if more than 1.0×106 progressive motile sperm per milliliter are found, it will be recommended to have sexual intercourse, and if that fails, the next step will be intrauterine insemination and later conventional in vitro fertilization. 

With less than 1.0×106 progressive motile sperm per milliliter, we will perform intracytoplasmic sperm injection. In case of azoospermia (no spermatozoa in the ejaculate), we will do a testicular biopsy in order to check if there are spermatozoa in the testes or if no spermatozoa are being produced.

History 
 In 1677 microbiologist Antonie van Leeuwenhoek discovered spermatozoa.
 In 1841 the Swiss anatomist Albert von Kölliker wrote about spermatozoon in his work Untersuchungen über die Bedeutung der Samenfäden (Studies on the importance of spermatozoa).

See also
Aneuploidy
Non-disjunction

References

External links

 Slower conception 'leads to boys'
 Human Sperm Under a Microscope

Germ cells
Semen
Human cells
Fertility
Men's health
Microscopic discoveries by Antonie van Leeuwenhoek